The Šumadija is a Serbian self-propelled multiple rocket launcher in development since 2017. It is based on Kamaz truck chassis and it is modular in design. It can launch 4 or 12 rockets 400mm up to 285 km range or 12 rockets 262mm up to 75 km range.

History
Development is partially based on experience gained on M-87 Orkan and KOL 15 - VERA 120 km 400mm rocket program developed by Military Technical Institute Belgrade in 1980' and further development of this projects in late 1990' and after 2000.

Characteristics
One battery usually consist of 3-6 launch weapons in artillery division or in bigger formation as a battalion or regiment with 9-18 launch vehicles. Included in formations is command, reload, communication, workshop and fuel vehicles together with combat support vehicles type of BOV M16 Miloš  that protects unit on march or in battle position against close enemy threats.

Using modern C4I2 battle management software together with UAV for guidance and observation, satellite, radar and other surveillance data and thanks to high missile precision it is very effective weapon for destroying command centers, airports, large enemy army groups and other valuable targets.

Rockets
There is two type of rocket in use by Šumadija MLRS:
400mm tactical ballistic missile originally called "Šumadija" and now "Јерина-1" with range of 285 km and circular error probable less than 150 meters if missile rely only on Inertial navigation system or when using inertial navigation combined with GPS data CEP is less than 50 meters.
262mm rocket called "Jerina 2" with range of up to 75 km - this rocket represents direct further development of Orkan MLRS rocket.

Jerina 1 400mm is rocket with correctable trajectory with warhead weight of 200 kg. Warhead is HE/fragmented with possible in future development thermobaric warhead would be on offer. Rocket weight is about 1550 kg and two rocket in one module weight 4200 kg. Rocket uses modern composite fuel. It is placed in container module made of steel.

Jerina 2 is 262mm rocket and comes with few type of warhead including HE/fragmented and 288 piece shaped charge bomblets type KB-2. It is placed in container module made of steel, possible future development of tubes used in LRSVM Morava.

Comparable systems
LYNX (MRL)
Astros II MLRS
HIMARS
MGM-140B/E ATACMS
Tochka
T-122 Sakarya
Fajr-5
TOROS
Falaq-2

References

Multiple rocket launchers of Serbia
Modular rocket launchers
Military vehicles introduced in the 2010s